The 6-cubic honeycomb or hexeractic honeycomb is the only regular space-filling tessellation (or honeycomb) in Euclidean 6-space.

It is analogous to the square tiling of the plane and to the cubic honeycomb of 3-space.

Constructions 
There are many different Wythoff constructions of this honeycomb. The most symmetric form is regular, with Schläfli symbol {4,34,4}. Another form has two alternating 6-cube facets (like a checkerboard) with Schläfli symbol {4,33,31,1}. The lowest symmetry Wythoff construction has 64 types of facets around each vertex and a prismatic product Schläfli symbol {∞}6.

Related honeycombs 
The [4,34,4], Coxeter group generates 127 permutations of uniform tessellations, 71 with unique symmetry and 70 with unique geometry. The expanded 6-cubic honeycomb is geometrically identical to the 6-cubic honeycomb.

The 6-cubic honeycomb can be alternated into the 6-demicubic honeycomb, replacing the 6-cubes with 6-demicubes, and the alternated gaps are filled by 6-orthoplex facets.

Trirectified 6-cubic honeycomb 
A trirectified 6-cubic honeycomb, contains all birectified 6-orthoplex facets and is the Voronoi tessellation of the D6* lattice.

See also 
List of regular polytopes

References 
 Coxeter, H.S.M. Regular Polytopes, (3rd edition, 1973), Dover edition,  p. 296, Table II: Regular honeycombs
 Kaleidoscopes: Selected Writings of H. S. M. Coxeter, edited by F. Arthur Sherk, Peter McMullen, Anthony C. Thompson, Asia Ivic Weiss, Wiley-Interscience Publication, 1995,  
 (Paper 24) H.S.M. Coxeter, Regular and Semi-Regular Polytopes III, [Math. Zeit. 200 (1988) 3-45]

Honeycombs (geometry)
7-polytopes
Regular tessellations